Miksa Déri (27 October 1854 November, Bács, Kingdom of Hungary, (now: Bač, Serbia) – 3 March 1938) was a Hungarian electrical engineer, inventor, power plant builder. He contributed with his partners Károly Zipernowsky and Ottó Bláthy, in the development of the closed iron core transformer and the ZBD model. His other important invention was the constant voltage AC electrical generator in the Ganz Works in 1883. The missing link of a full Voltage sensitive - voltage intensive (VSVI) system was the reliable AC Constant Voltage generator. Therefore, the invention of the constant voltage generator at the Ganz Works had  crucial role in the beginnings of the industrial scale AC power generating, because only these type of generators can produce a stated output voltage, regardless of the value of the actual load.

ZBD was an abbreviation of the three men's names: Zipernowsky, Bláthy and Déri.

Déri is also noted for inventing the single phase type of repulsion motor

Education 
 There is a  named after Miksa Déri in  Hungary.
 There is a named after Miksa Déri in  Hungary that offers courses preparing students for the engineering fields.

References

External links
 Hungarian Patent Office's Miksa Déri (1854 - 1938)
  Biography of Miksa Déri

1854 births
1938 deaths
Hungarian inventors
Hungarian electrical engineers
Austro-Hungarian engineers
Austro-Hungarian inventors